The Bahr Aouk River is a river in central Africa. It arises in eastern Chad at the border to Sudan and flows southwest, forming a significant portion of the international boundary between Chad and the Central African Republic. The Bahr Aouk meets the Chari River, which leaves the border and flows north into the Chad.

Hydrometry
The flow of the river has been observed for over 22 years (1952–74) at Golongoso a town just short of the confluence with the Chari.

References

Rivers of Chad
Rivers of the Central African Republic
Ramsar sites in Chad
Chari River
International rivers of Africa
Central African Republic–Chad border